Elsinoë brasiliensis is a species of fungus in the Elsinoaceae family. A plant pathogen, it was first formally described in 1942.

References 

Elsinoë
Fungi described in 1942
Fungal plant pathogens and diseases